Nguyễn Danh Phương (?–1751) was a Vietnamese rebel leader who active in 18th-century.

Born in Yên Lạc, Sơn Tây (mordern a part of Vĩnh Yên, Vĩnh Phúc Province). He rebelled against Trịnh lord in 1740, and occupied Tam Đảo Mountain. Local people called him Quận Hẻo. Later, he occupied Ngọc Bội Mountain, titled himself Thuận Thiên Khải Vận Đại Nhân (順天啓運大人), and started to collect taxes in Tuyên Quang.

He was defeated and captured by Trịnh Doanh in 1751. In the same year, he was executed in Thang Long together with Nguyễn Hữu Cầu.

See also
Nguyễn Hữu Cầu
Hoàng Công Chất
Lê Duy Mật

References

Khâm định Việt sử Thông giám cương mục
Việt Nam sử lược
Danh nhân quân sự Việt Nam, Nhiều tác giả, Nhà xuất bản Quân đội nhân dân, 2006
Biên niên lịch sử cổ trung đại Việt Nam, Viện Sử học, Nhà xuất bản Khoa học xã hội Hà Nội, 1987

1751 deaths
Vietnamese rebels
People of Revival Lê dynasty
People from Vĩnh Phúc province
People executed by Vietnam
Executed Vietnamese people